Jan Sýkora (born 29 December 1993) is a Czech professional footballer who plays as a midfielder for Viktoria Plzeň.

Club career
Sýkora began his professional career at Sparta Prague, but failed to make a league appearance for their first team. He also spent time on loan at Zbrojovka Brno.

In 2015, he transferred to Slovan Liberec. On 15 September 2016 he scored the fastest-ever goal of UEFA Europa League, finding the net after just 10.69 seconds in Liberec's group stage match against Qarabağ FK. In total, he made 34 league appearances for Liberec, scoring one goal.

Slavia Prague
After a lengthy battle for his signature between Slavia Prague and Viktoria Plzeň, the two frontrunners for the league title at the time, Sýkora signed for Slavia Prague in January 2017.

On 22 November 2018, Sýkora signed a new contract with Slavia until the summer of 2022.

In February 2019, he returned to Slovan Liberec on loan until the end of the season.

Lech Poznań
On 24 August 2020, Sýkora signed a four-year contract with Polish Ekstraklasa side Lech Poznań. He made his debut 6 days later during league match against Wisła Płock.

Viktoria Plzeň
On 6 July 2022, Sýkora signed a three-year contract with Czech First League side Viktoria Plzeň.

International career
Sýkora got his first call up to the senior Czech Republic side for a friendly against Armenia and a 2018 FIFA World Cup qualification match against Northern Ireland in August 2016.

Career statistics

1 Including Polish Super Cup.

International goals
Scores and results list Czech Republic's goal tally first, score column indicates score after each Sýkora goal.

Honours
Slavia Prague
Czech First League: 2016–17, 2018–19
Czech Cup: 2017–18, 2018–19

Viktoria Plzeň
Czech First League: 2021–22

Lech Poznań
Ekstraklasa: 2021–22

References

External links
 
 Jan Sýkora official international statistics
 
 
 

1993 births
Living people
Sportspeople from Plzeň
Czech footballers
Association football midfielders
Czech Republic youth international footballers
Czech Republic under-21 international footballers
Czech Republic international footballers
Czech First League players
Ekstraklasa players
II liga players
AC Sparta Prague players
FC Zbrojovka Brno players
FC Slovan Liberec players
SK Slavia Prague players
FK Jablonec players
FC Viktoria Plzeň players
Lech Poznań players
Lech Poznań II players
Czech expatriate footballers
Czech expatriate sportspeople in Poland
Expatriate footballers in Poland
Czech National Football League players